High-Rise is a 1975 novel by British writer J. G. Ballard. The story describes the disintegration of a luxury high-rise building as its affluent residents gradually descend into violent chaos. As with Ballard's previous novels Crash (1973) and Concrete Island (1974), High-Rise inquires into the ways in which modern social and technological landscapes could alter the human psyche in provocative and hitherto unexplored ways. It was adapted into a film of the same name, in 2015, by director Ben Wheatley.

Plot
Following his divorce, doctor and medical-school lecturer Robert Laing moves into his new apartment on the 25th floor of a recently completed high-rise building on the outskirts of London. This tower block provides its affluent tenants all the conveniences and commodities that modern life has to offer: a supermarket, bank, restaurant, hair salon, swimming pools, a gymnasium, its own school, and high-speed lifts. Its cutting-edge amenities allow the occupants to gradually become uninterested in the outside world, providing them with accommodation and a secure environment.

Laing meets fellow tenants Charlotte Melville, a secretary who lives one floor above him, and Richard Wilder, a documentary film-maker who lives with his family on the building's lower floors. Life in the high-rise begins to degenerate quickly, as minor power failures and petty grievances among neighbours and between rival floors escalate into an orgy of violence. Skirmishes become frequent throughout the building as whole floors of tenants try to claim lifts and hold them for their own. Groups gather to defend their rights to the swimming pools, and party-goers attack "enemy floors" to raid and vandalise them. The lower, middle, and upper floors of the building gradually stratify into distinct groups.

It does not take long for the occupants to ignore social restraints, abandoning life outside the building and devoting their time to the escalation of violence inside; people quit their jobs, and families stay indoors permanently, losing all sense of time. As the amenities of the high-rise break down and bodies begin to pile up, no one considers leaving or alerting the authorities, instead exploring the newly-found urges and desires engendered by the building's disintegration. As Laing navigates the new environment, Wilder sets out to reach floor 40—the top of the building—and finally confront the building's architect, Anthony Royal.

Legacy
High-Rise was known to be among Joy Division singer Ian Curtis's favourite books. The book has been cited as an influence upon the 1987 Doctor Who serial Paradise Towers. Hawkwind used the book as the basis for a song of the same name on their 1979 album PXR5.

In a lecture on JG Ballard with John Gray, Will Self represented Withnail and I director Bruce Robinson's interpretation of the story which has "the unconscious, the car park of the building, penetrating the ego in the conquest of the super ego in the top of the building." He then stated that Ballard would have hated that interpretation, with Self preferring instead the interpretation that "Freudian ideas swirl and fail to coalesce," as they are "appropriated by individual mythomanes without actually reflecting an external reality."

Godspeed You! Black Emperor listed it among their recommended reading list to coincide with their appearance and curation of All Tomorrow's Parties (festival) "

Artwork
The cover of the novel's first edition shows a high rise in Berlin's Hansaviertel designed by the German architect Hans Schwippert.

Film adaptation

For over 30 years, British producer Jeremy Thomas had wanted to do a film version of the book. It was nearly made in the late 1970s, with Nicolas Roeg directing from a script by Paul Mayersberg. Later attempts with Canadian film-maker Vincenzo Natali attached to write and direct also failed, before the film adaptation was finally made in 2014.

With Jeremy Thomas producing, Ben Wheatley directing from a script by Amy Jump, and Tom Hiddleston starring in the lead role,  the film had its world première at the Toronto International Film Festival on September 13th, 2015, and was widely released in early 2016.

References

External links

 JG Ballard.ca
High-Rise at the British Library

1975 British novels
British novels adapted into films
British thriller novels
1975 science fiction novels
Jonathan Cape books
Novels by J. G. Ballard
Novels set in London
Novels about technology
Postmodern novels